"Copper Kettle" (also known as "Get you a Copper Kettle", "In the pale moonlight") is a song composed by Albert Frank Beddoe and made popular by Joan Baez. Pete Seeger's account dates the song to 1946, mentioning its probable folk origin, while in a 1962 Time readers column A. F. Beddoe says that the song was written by him in 1953 as part of the folk opera Go Lightly, Stranger. The song praises the good aspects of moonshining as told to the listener by a man whose "daddy made whiskey, and granddaddy did too". The line "We ain't paid no whiskey tax since 1792" alludes to an unpopular tax imposed in 1791 by the fledgling U.S. federal government. The levy provoked the Whiskey Rebellion and generally had a short life, barely lasting until 1803. Enjoyable lyrics and simple melody turned "Copper Kettle" into a popular folk song.

Performed by 
 Joan Baez, recorded in Joan Baez in Concert, 1962
 Two Tones (a duet including Gordon Lightfoot), on the album Two Tones at the Village Corner, 1962
 The Country Gentlemen, recorded for Starday Records, 1963
 Chet Atkins, Guitar Country, 1964; and in various live settings.
 Bob Dylan, on the album Self Portrait, 1970, and  Another Self Portrait, 2013.
 Tony Joe White, on the album Tony Joe White, 1971
 Damnations TX on the album "Live Set" recorded in Austin, TX in 1996
 Devendra Banhart in live concert
 Jump, Little Children, on the album Live At The Dock Street Theatre, 2006
 Gillian Welch and David Rawlings in live concert
 Robyn Hitchcock, live at Borders Books, 2004
 Kreuzberg Museum, on the album Ten American Classics, 2006
 Jack Dallas, David Beddoe, live performance of the musical "Copper Kettle" (formerly "Go Lightly, Stranger") at the NYC Music Marathon, Dramatists Guild, NYC April 16, 2012
 Old Blind Dogs
 Bobby Womack, recorded in Lookin' for a Love Again, 1974
 Tommy Emmanuel with Rob Ickes and Trey Hensley, 2021
 The A's (Alexandra Sauser-Monnig and Amelia Meath), on the album Fruit, 2022

See also 
Moonshining

References

External links

 

Joan Baez songs
Bob Dylan songs
Tony Joe White songs
Folk opera
Moonshine in popular culture